Lasam, officially the Municipality of Lasam, is a third class municipality in the province of Cagayan, Philippines. According to the 2020 census, it has a population of 41,225 people.

The town was once a part of the Municipality of Gattaran, that stretches the width of the province and bisected by the Cagayan River. The barangays west of the river was established as the separate town of Lasam in 1950 by Republic Act No. 507.  The new municipality of Lasam became part of the Second Representative District of the Province of Cagayan, while Gattaran is in the First District.

Etymology
The Municipality of Lasam was named after the late Cagayan Governor Honorio Lasam.

History
Lasam was once a part of Gattaran separated from the mother town by the wide Cagayan River with no bridges connecting the communities. As the population increased, the residents of the western part of the town asked to be created as a separate municipality.

The town was established on June 13, 1950, by Republic Act No. 507 and signed by President Elpidio Quirino. Barrios (barangays) of Gattaran located west of the Cagayan River were formed into the new and regular Municipality of Lasam, with the old site of the Barrio Macatabang as the seat of the government.

The town was officially inaugurated as independent from Gattaran in January 1951.  Ignacio Jurado was appointed as its first mayor whose major task was to build the infrastructure of the new independent town of Lasam.

Geography

Barangays
Lasam is politically subdivided into 30 barangays. These barangays are headed by elected officials: Barangay Captain, Barangay Council, whose members are called Barangay Councilors. All are elected every three years.

Climate

Demographics

Economy 

Lasam is primarily an agricultural community and its people derive their income mainly from farming and livestock raising.

Government
Lasam, belonging to the second legislative district of the province of Cagayan, is governed by a mayor designated as its local chief executive and by a municipal council as its legislative body in accordance with the Local Government Code. The mayor, vice mayor, and the councilors are elected directly by the people through an election which is being held every three years.

Elected officials

Education
The Schools Division of Cagayan governs the town's public education system. The division office is a field office of the DepEd in Cagayan Valley region. The office governs the public and private elementary and public and private high schools throughout the municipality.

The Cagayan State University has a satellite campus in the municipality. The Lasam Institute of Technology offers TESDA programs.

References

External links
[ Philippine Standard Geographic Code]
Philippine Census Information

Municipalities of Cagayan
Populated places on the Rio Grande de Cagayan